Crystal Wahpepah is an indigenous American chef. She was the first indigenous chef on the cooking program Chopped. Wahpepah runs both a catering business and a restaurant, which aim to reclaim Native American cuisine. She received the Indigenous Artist Activist Award.
 
Wahpepah was born and raised in Oakland, California. She is a member of the Kickapoo, Sac, and Fox tribes from Oklahoma. As a child, she cooked with her older relatives.

Career 
Wahpepah attended the Le Cordon Bleu cooking school, where she studied French cooking. Later, she traveled around the United States and learned more about Native farming and cooking. At the time of the opening of her restaurant, Wahpepah's Kitchen, there were no indigenous food restaurants in the San Francisco Bay Area.

References

Year of birth missing (living people)
20th-century births
Living people
21st-century Native American women
Native American chefs
People from Oakland, California